Outside Inside is the fifth release and third studio album of Colorado-based Jam band, The String Cheese Incident. Released in 2001, this album marked a shift from the band's traditional bluegrass leanings to a more standard rock sound, thus making it the most accessible album to a mainstream audience to that point. The band did not completely abandon its bluegrass roots, however, sneaking in the short three-minute track "Up the Canyon" at the end of the disc, which has become one of many live favorites along with "Rollover," "Close Your Eyes," and others.

Track listing
"Outside and Inside"  (Bill Nershi) – 4:42 
"Joyful Sound"  (Keith Moseley) – 6:28 
"Close Your Eyes"  (Kyle Hollingsworth) – 4:50 
"Search"  (Bill Nershi, Ernest Randrianosolo) – 4:38 
"Drifting"  (Bill Nershi) – 3:28 
"Black and White"  (Michael Kang, Dain Pape) – 6:11 
"Lost"  (Kyle Hollingsworth) – 4:50 
"Latinissmo"  (Kyle Hollingsworth) – 5:10 
"Sing a New Song"  (Bill Nershi) – 4:41 
"Rollover"  (Michael Kang, Dain Pape) – 10:56 
"Up the Canyon"  (Michael Kang, Keith Moseley, Bill Nershi) – 3:01

Credits

The String Cheese Incident
Bill Nershi – Acoustic Guitar
Keith Moseley – Bass guitar
Kyle Hollingsworth – Accordion, Organ, Piano, Synthesizer, Fender Rhodes
Michael Kang– Mandolin, Violin
Michael Travis – percussion, drums

Additional Personnel
Andy Cleaves – Trumpet
Karl Denson – Saxophone

Production
Steve Berlin – Producer
Dave McNair – Engineer
Doug Sax – Mastering
The String Cheese Incident – Arranger
Bill Nershi – Arranger
Robert Hadley – Mastering
Todd Radunsky – Cover Photo
Sophie Lynn Morris - Cover Model

The String Cheese Incident albums
2001 albums